Phaenonotum exstriatum is a species of water scavenger beetle in the family Hydrophilidae. It is found in the Caribbean Sea, Central America, and North America.

References

Further reading

 

Hydrophilidae
Articles created by Qbugbot
Beetles described in 1835